Fen is a 1983 play by Caryl Churchill. While not as well known as Churchill works like Cloud 9 (1979) and Top Girls (1982), it has been praised by many critics.

Reception 
After viewing the Joint Stock Theatre Group performance at The Public Theater, John Beaufort of The Christian Science Monitor billed Fen as "a fascinating mosaic in theatrical terms." Beaufort praised "the authenticity of its material, the skill with which the elements have been drawn together by Miss Churchill, and the performance of a remarkable troupe." In The New York Times, Frank Rich described the play as "dour, difficult and [...] never coy about its rather stridently doctrinaire socialism: it's the most stylistically consistent of Miss Churchill's plays and at times the most off-putting. It is also yet another confirmation that its author possesses one of the boldest theatrical imaginations to emerge in this decade." The critic wrote that Churchill's "concentrated dramatization of their lives has an open, poetic intensity that transcends the flat tendentiousness of mere agitprop."

In 2004, Paul Taylor of The Independent argued of the play, "It's amazing how much detail and insight Churchill manages to pack into a succession of spare, short scenes that here succeed each other with a heightened, dream-like fluency. The effect is a haunting blend of intimacy (often dourly comic) and (with roles deliberately cast regardless of age and looks) objectifying defamiliarisation." In 2011, academic Jill Dolan wrote that Fen "represents the British feminist playwright at her best". She praised set pieces such as the dirt covering the playing area: "Even when scenes move to various characters’ homes or other social settings, the dirt remains, a palpable reminder that these people are always mired in the manual labor that provides their only livelihood." The critic argued that "Churchill doesn’t lay individual blame, but constructs a social constellation in which each character is interdependent with the others, even if their access to power and wealth differently marks their experience." Dolan wrote that "Fen is wrenching because even in the midst of such lack, the characters do dream. Val isn’t the only woman with desires; they’re all simply at different stages of reconciling to the fact that they’ll never be fulfilled."

Tom Wicker of Exeunt praised the play as "unsentimental and richly written". Wicker praised the set design as evocative and also stated that the dialogue "is suitably earthy, enriched with colloquialisms and nuggets of folklore that turn the play into something more interesting and freestanding than the straightforward diatribe against early ‘80s capitalism it threatens to be at the start." In The Guardian, Lyn Gardner described Fen as a "mysterious, tantalising play that, with its elliptical scenes and multiple characters, refuses to spoon-feed its audience. It offers a clear-eyed, feminist-socialist perspective on women and labour, but there is something darker and wilder lurking in its witchy psychic landscape." Gardner dubbed the work "a reminder that British theatre has produced no more a courageous writer or one who mines our dark, damaged psyches with such forensic thoughtfulness as Churchill."

Don Aucoin of The Boston Globe reviewed the 2012 Factory Theatre performance positively, stating (with regards to the phrase "class warfare") that "Churchill has always understood which side is the aggressor. That comprehension, fortified by Churchill’s strongly feminist outlook, undergirds her desolate and gripping 1983 drama 'Fen.'" Aucoin described the work as "a series of brief but indelible vignettes" and viewed Val as the play's most poignant figure, arguing that her actions are believable given her extreme circumstances.

References

External links 

 

Plays by Caryl Churchill
1983 plays
Feminist plays